The Global Educational Network for Satellite Operations (GENSO) is forming by a worldwide network of ground stations and spacecraft which can interact via a software standard. The GENSO aims to increase the return from educational space missions and changed the way that these missions are managed, dramatically increasing the level of access to orbital educational spacecraft.

History 

In November 2007, a kickoff meeting was held at the CubeSat workshop.  This short presentation (at Aalborg University in Denmark) to the rest of the GENSO groups described work at Cal Poly for the project. This workshop kicked off the Alpha Test phase of the project. The entire project was successfully demoed in front of a live audience (us), and it worked beautifully. The Mission Control Client booked downlink sessions with the Ground Station Server, and the Ground Station Server controlled the radio and rotors at the AAU ground station (across the building). The running Authentication Server authenticated people and registered satellites on the network.

In February 2009, the ROBUSTA  project joined the GENSO initiative. ROBUSTA is the first French university CubeSat. The objective of the payload experiment is to measure the radiation induced degradation of electronic devices. Flight data will be compared to the results of a novel prediction method taking into account the Enhanced Low Dose Rate Sensitivity. The second interesting point of this project is that it's a real educational project. Although the system hasn't yet grown to the "hundreds" of ground stations identified in Alexandru Munteanu's Thesis from 2009, testing and integration continue to proceed.

The GENSO project initiated under the guidance of the International Space Education Board (ISEB) has many existing capabilities and is accumulating the interest of large groups inside and outside of the United States. However, it is still lacking a fully equipped ground station that can complement its capabilities.

Since 2011, a great deal of work has been done on Release 1E of GENSO to help make it more user friendly and reliable for the Amateur Radio community. Ground stations like the one at COSMIAC are now running 24/7 downloading data for educational satellites such as the University of Michigan RAX-2 spacecraft.

How GENSO works 

The GENSO system is a software networking standard which allows a user to communicate with a spacecraft by using a remote ground station which has a clear view of the spacecraft. Communications between the client computer (a mission controlcomputer) and the ground station server are conducted across the Internet.
There are three major components to the GENSO system :
 GSS – Ground Station Server
 MCC - The Mission Control Client is the control station for a satellite. Each satellite will have one MCC. A GSS will see a snapshot of the satellite but only MCC will have the entire picture
 AUS – The Authentication Server is the server that mediates communication between MCCs and GSSs on the GENSO network. When a ground station wants to join the network, the AUS permits them and then assigns them bookings to accomplish. The current AUS is located in Vigo, Spain and the backup is at Cal Poly: San Luis Obispo.

There are also three main components that the GENSO system remotely controls:
 Rotator Controller
 Terminal node control
 Radio Controller

The GENSO software is written in Java. GENSO was developed and is currently maintained under the auspices of the European Space Agency (ESA).

List of members 
Source:

See also 
 AX.25 Packets
 Antenna Rotator
 Amsat
 CNES
 JAXA
 NASA
 Canadian Space Agency
 SatNOGS

Notes and references

External links 
 GENSO Website 
 GENSO was recently presented in the 2011 August CubeSat Workshop in Logan Utah. Here is the video.
 GENSO – A Ground Station is a Terrible Thing to Waste by Craig Kief, KE5VSH, craig.kief@cosmiac.org from AMSAT Journal May/June 2011 AMSAT Article on GENSO
 PDF of paper GENSO, SPA, SDR, and GNU Radio: The Pathway Ahead for Space Dial Tone Ryan L. Buffington, Craig J. Kief, R. Scott Erwin, Joshua F. Androlewicz, and James Lyke Infotech@Aerospace Conference, Unleashing Unmanned Systems St. Louis, Missouri, 29-31 March 2011
 GENSO European Space Agency created and validated it through the GEOID project.
 Ivo Klinkert (PA1IVO) from the Open Universiteit in the Netherlands describes many of the features and capabilities in his Master Thesis shown here or here
 GENSO AIAA SpaceDialTone

Satellite operators
Amateur radio